Dachau is a Landkreis (district) in Bavaria, Germany. It is bounded by (from the south and clockwise) the districts of Fürstenfeldbruck, Aichach-Friedberg, Pfaffenhofen, Freising and Munich, and by the city of Munich.

History 
The district was established in 1952. There were slight changes to the territory in the administrative reform of 1972.

Geography 

The district extends from the northwestern suburbs of Munich to the so-called Dachauer Land. It is a hilly countryside, which is now densely populated. The growing Munich metropolitan area is advancing more and more into the district's territory.

Coat of arms 
The arms include a red zigzag line on white background, which was the heraldic figure of the Wittelsbach family during the 12th and 13th century. Although it was not used anymore from the 14th century on, it is now part of the arms of Dachau in order to symbolise, that Dachau is an old part of the Bavarian state. In the upper part of the arms the blue and white checkered pattern of Bavaria is displayed.

Towns and municipalities

References

External links 

  (German)

 
Districts of Bavaria